Margaret S. Chin (born May 26, 1953) is a Hong Kong American politician who served as a council member for the 1st district of the New York City Council.  A Democrat, she and Queens Council member Peter Koo comprised the Asian American delegation of the city council.

Her district included all or parts of Battery Park City, Chinatown, Civic Center, East Village, Ellis Island, Financial District, Governors Island, Greenwich Village, Liberty Island, Little Italy, Lower East Side, NoHo, Nolita, SoHo, Tribeca, and the West Village. Chin controversially retained the right to run a third term despite its unpopularity in 2010. Seven years later, she ran for re-election and won her primary with 46% of the vote against a newcomer, Christopher Marte, who received 44%.

Early life and career
Born on May 26, 1954 in British Hong Kong as the third of five children and the only daughter in the family, Chin immigrated to the United States in 1963. Her father, who arrived in the U.S. before his family, was an undocumented worker, working as a waiter in the Bronx; his experiences inspired his daughter to advocate for immigration reform during her political tenure.

Chin grew up in Chinatown in New York City and graduated from the Bronx High School of Science and the City College of New York with a degree in education. She worked for 14 years at LaGuardia Community College's Division of Adult and Continuing Education.

She has been a member of several public service groups and organizations. In 1974, she was a founding member of Asian Americans for Equality, a group dedicated to "empowering Asian Americans and others in need", and she served as the board's president from 1982 to 1986. She was the chairperson of the New York Immigration Coalition, a policy and advocacy organization which works on issues concerning immigrants and refugees. She was a board member of the Association for Neighborhood and Housing Development, an affordable housing non-profit organization. Chin was also a founding member of the Chinatown Partnership Local Development Corporation, a group that was formed in 2006 to "rebuild Chinatown following 9/11, and to preserve the neighborhood's unique culture while ensuring its vitality in the future."

In local and state politics, Chin was a member of Manhattan Community Board 1 and Manhattan Community Board 3, and was elected to the New York State Democratic Committee for two terms from 1986 to 1990.

Chin has stated that her ethnicity helped her win the district that includes Chinatown. In her words, many new immigrants and seniors do not speak English, and appreciated that they could speak to her directly and "talk to a City Council member without having to go through an interpreter." Hunter College professor and sociologist Peter Kwong, who has written books on Chinese Americans, said that Chin's election victory at the time was a "milestone in an increasingly active Asian American community" and a "special moment in Chinatown history". Margaret Fung, head of Asian American Legal Defense and Education Fund, a national Asian American civil rights group, described her win as a "significant step forward for Asian American political representation".

New York City Council
Prior to winning the 2009 city council election, Chin had run and lost in the Democratic Party primary election for the District 1 seat in 1991, 1993, and 2001.

In a primary with low voter turnout, she won the Democratic nomination with 39% of the vote, ousting two-term incumbent Alan Gerson. Chin earned 4,541 votes to Gerson's 3,520; the other three candidates, PJ Kim, Pete Gleason, and Arthur Gregory won 1,927 votes, 1,293 votes, and 235 votes, respectively. Campaigning on the issues of affordable housing, improving infrastructure, immigration reform, and better services for senior citizens, Chin won the general election held on November 3, 2009 against Republican candidate Irene Horvath in a landslide, carrying 86% of the vote.

In 2013, Chin ran for reelection. She received an endorsement from the Stonewall Democratic Club of New York prior to that year's September Democratic Party primary and received funding from REBNY for mailings. She was challenged in the primary by Democrat Jenifer Rajkumar, a Lower Manhattan District Leader, in a widely publicized race. Chin won with 58.5% of the vote.

The councilwoman retained the right to run a third term despite New Yorkers voting against the concept in 2010. In 2017, Chin ran for re-election and won her primary with 46% of the vote against her main challenger, Christopher Marte, a newcomer, who received 44%. Marte ran against her again in the general election on the Independence party line, and Chin won the general election with 49.8% of the vote.

Election history

Criticism
In September 2017 The Villager endorsed her opponent Christopher Marte, saying 

Critics in October 2019 also opposed her lack of clarity before the vote to expand the current jail in her district; more than 1,000 marched to get her attention on the matter.

Personal life
Chin is married to Alan Tung, a public school teacher. Their son, Kevin, also graduated from the Bronx High School of Science. He completed his studies at Syracuse University, and is now studying photography in Santa Barbara, California.

References

External links
 Official New York City Council website

New York City Council members
Living people
Hong Kong emigrants to the United States
New York (state) Democrats
1954 births
Asian-American people in New York (state) politics
Women New York City Council members
21st-century American politicians
21st-century American women politicians
Asian-American New York City Council members